Oleksandr Klyuchko (Ukrainian: Олександр Ключко) (born July 11, 1984 in Mykolaiv) is an amateur boxer from Ukraine who won a bronze medal in the lightweight division at the 2006 European Amateur Boxing Championships. He has qualified for the 2008 Olympics.

Career
At the European Championships he won against Domenico Valentino 30:18 and future world champion Frankie Gavin 42:26, but lost to Olympic champion Alexey Tishchenko 29:42 and took bronze.

At the World Championships 2007 he defeated Asian champion Hu Qing 26:13 but lost against by Colombian Darley Perez 10:13.

He qualified for the 2008 Olympics by defeating Daouda Sow and Azerbaijani boxer Ramal Amanov in the semifinal of a European qualifying tournament. In his Olympic debut he lost to Hu Qing of China, 8:10.

At the 2010 European Amateur Boxing Championships at Moscow, Russia he won the bronze medal. In the semifinals he lost to Hrachik Javakhyan from Armenia.

External links
 Olympic qualifier
 AIBA results for Olympic qualification.
 2006 European Championships Results
sports-reference

1984 births
Lightweight boxers
Living people
Boxers at the 2008 Summer Olympics
Olympic boxers of Ukraine
Sportspeople from Mykolaiv
Ukrainian male boxers
21st-century Ukrainian people